"Slippery When Wet" is a 1975 single by American band the Commodores. The song was written by lead guitarist, Thomas McClary. The track is from their second album Caught in the Act.

Chart performance
It was the group's first single to reach number one on the soul singles chart in the US and was their second top 40 pop single, peaked at number nineteen on the Billboard Hot 100.

Charts

Cover versions
The Sons of Champlin recorded the song in 1976 for their album A Circle Filled With Love (Ariola) as "Slippery When It's Wet".

Samples
The Limbomaniacs sampled the song heavily in their song "Shake It" (1990)  https://www.youtube.com/watch?v=IedAaxFEF8Y

References

1975 songs
1975 singles
Commodores songs